Mils is a municipality in the district Innsbruck-Land of Tyrol, Austria. It is located 12 km east of Innsbruck. The area is restricted by the Weißenbach in the west and the Inn in the south. The location was mentioned in documents in 930 for the first time. In the last 40 years Mils grew enormously thanks to its sunny location.

Population

References

External links

 Municipality Mils: Official website of the municipality in the Hall-Wattens region

Cities and towns in Innsbruck-Land District